Nepenthes maxima (from Latin: maximus "greatest"), the great pitcher-plant, is a carnivorous pitcher plant species of the genus Nepenthes.  It has a relatively wide distribution covering New Guinea, Sulawesi, and the Maluku Islands. It may also be present on Wowoni Island.

Nepenthes maxima belongs to the loosely defined "N. maxima complex", which also includes, among other species, N. boschiana, N. chaniana, N. epiphytica, N. eymae, N. faizaliana, N. fusca, N. klossii, N. platychila, N. stenophylla, and N. vogelii.

Variability
This species exhibits great variability across its range, particularly in the plasticity of its pitchers. Plants growing in drier, somewhat seasonal parts of New Guinea generally produce elongated pitchers with narrow peristomes and well-developed waxy zones, while those inhabiting perhumid areas often have a reduced waxy zone and enlarged peristome. This is thought to be because the peristome, when fully wetted, is more effective at trapping prey than the waxy zone, but performs poorly in drier conditions.

Certain forms of N. maxima produce distinctly wavy laminar margins, a trait particularly common in plants from Sulawesi. In extreme examples, even the decurrent wings of the leaf—which can extend down the entire length of the stem's internode—may be highly undulate. Such rippled patterns result from increased cell growth near the edges of the leaf, which causes its thin, planar surface to buckle as it assumes the conformation with the lowest energy state.

Infraspecific taxa

Nepenthes maxima f. undulata Sh.Kurata, Atsumi & Y.Komatsu (1985)
Nepenthes maxima var. glabrata Becc. in sched. nom.nud.
Nepenthes maxima var. lowii (Hook.f.) Becc. (1886) [=N. stenophylla]
Nepenthes maxima var. minor Macfarl. (1917)
Nepenthes maxima var. sumatrana (Miq.) Becc. (1886) [=N. sumatrana]
Nepenthes maxima var. superba (Hort.Veitch ex Marshall) Veitch (1897)

In 2009, a cultivar from Lake Poso in Sulawesi was named Nepenthes maxima 'Lake Poso'. In 2016, this taxon was described as a species in its own right, N. minima.

Natural hybrids
? N. eymae × N. maxima
N. glabrata × N. maxima
N. klossii × N. maxima
N. maxima × N. neoguineensis
N. maxima × N. tentaculata

References

Further reading

 [Anonymous] 1889. Nepenthes at Messrs. Veitch's. The Gardeners' Chronicle, series 3, 6(145): 388. 
 [Anonymous] 2010. Eramet-PT Weda Bay Nickel Exploration and Development ESIA. ERM Indonesia, Jakarta. 
 Adam, J.H., C.C. Wilcock & M.D. Swaine 1992.  Journal of Tropical Forest Science 5(1): 13–25.
 Adam, J.H. 1997.  Pertanika Journal of Tropical Agricultural Science 20(2–3): 121–134.
 Adam, J.H. & C.C. Wilcock 1999.  Pertanika Journal of Tropical Agricultural Science 22(1): 1–7.
 Amoroso, V.B., L.D. Obsioma, J.B. Arlalejo, R.A. Aspiras, D.P. Capili, J.J.A. Polizon & E.B. Sumile 2009. Inventory and conservation of endangered, endemic and economically important flora of Hamiguitan Range, southern Philippines. Blumea 54(1–3): 71–76.  
 Amoroso, V.B. & R.A. Aspiras 2011. Hamiguitan Range: a sanctuary for native flora. Saudi Journal of Biological Sciences 18(1): 7–15. 
 Bauer, U., C.J. Clemente, T. Renner & W. Federle 2012. Form follows function: morphological diversification and alternative trapping strategies in carnivorous Nepenthes pitcher plants. Journal of Evolutionary Biology 25(1): 90–102. 
 Beveridge, N.G.P., C. Rauch, P.J.A. Keßler, R.R. van Vugt & P.C. van Welzen 2013. A new way to identify living species of Nepenthes (Nepenthaceae): more data needed! Carnivorous Plant Newsletter 42(4): 122–128.
  Blume, C.L. 1852. Ord. Nepenthaceae. In: Museum Botanicum Lugduno-Batavum, sive stirpium exoticarum novarum vel minus cognitarum ex vivis aut siccis brevis expositio. Tom. II. Nr. 1. E.J. Brill, Lugduni-Batavorum. pp. 5–10.
 Bonhomme, V., H. Pelloux-Prayer, E. Jousselin, Y. Forterre, J.-J. Labat & L. Gaume 2011. Slippery or sticky? Functional diversity in the trapping strategy of Nepenthes carnivorous plants. New Phytologist 191(2): 545–554. 
 Clarke, C.M. 2006. Introduction. In: Danser, B.H. The Nepenthaceae of the Netherlands Indies. Natural History Publications (Borneo), Kota Kinabalu. pp. 1–15.
 Corner, E.J.H. 1996. Pitcher-plants (Nepenthes). In: K.M. Wong & A. Phillipps (eds.) Kinabalu: Summit of Borneo. A Revised and Expanded Edition. The Sabah Society, Kota Kinabalu. pp. 115–121. . 
  Darma, I.D.P., I.P. Suendra & H.-M. Siregar 2004. BP-17: Keanekaragaman Nepenthes di Taman Wisata Alam Nanggala III, Luwu, Sulawesi Selatan. [Nepenthes diversity in Taman Wisata Alam Nanggala III, Luwu, Sulawesi Selatan.] [pp. xiv–xv] In: Abstrak: Konggres dan Seminar Nasional Penggalang Taksonomi Tumbuhan Indonesia (PTTI) Universitas Sebelas Maret Surakarta, 19-20 Desember 2003. Sisipan Biodiversitas 5(1): i–xxxii. 
  Darma, I.D.P., I.P. Suendra & H.-M. Siregar 2004. Keanekaragaman Nepenthes di Taman Wisata Alam Nanggala III, Luwu, Sulawesi Selatan. [Diversity of Nepenthes at ecotour forest Nanggala III, Luwu, South Sulawesi.] BioSMART 6(2): 126–129. 
 Dixon, W.E. 1889. Nepenthes. The Gardeners' Chronicle, series 3, 6(144): 354. 
 James, G. 1993.  Carnivorous Plant Newsletter 22(1–2): 29–30.
 Kitching, R.L. 2000. Food Webs and Container Habitats: The natural history and ecology of phytotelmata. Cambridge University Press, Cambridge.
 Lecoufle, M. 1990. Nepenthes maxima. In: Carnivorous Plants: Care and Cultivation. Blandford, London. pp. 124–125.
  Mansur, M. 2001.  In: Prosiding Seminar Hari Cinta Puspa dan Satwa Nasional. Lembaga Ilmu Pengetahuan Indonesia, Bogor. pp. 244–253.
 Masters, M.T. 1889. Nepenthes Curtisi. The Gardeners' Chronicle, series 3, 6(154): 660–661.
 Masters, M.T. 1890. New or noteworthy plants. Nepenthes stenophylla, Mast., sp. n.. The Gardeners' Chronicle, series 3, 8(192): 240. 
 McPherson, S.R. & A. Robinson 2012. Field Guide to the Pitcher Plants of Australia and New Guinea. Redfern Natural History Productions, Poole.
 Meimberg, H., A. Wistuba, P. Dittrich & G. Heubl 2001. Molecular phylogeny of Nepenthaceae based on cladistic analysis of plastid trnK intron sequence data. Plant Biology 3(2): 164–175. 
  Meimberg, H. 2002.  Ph.D. thesis, Ludwig Maximilian University of Munich, Munich.
 Meimberg, H. & G. Heubl 2006. Introduction of a nuclear marker for phylogenetic analysis of Nepenthaceae. Plant Biology 8(6): 831–840. 
 Meimberg, H., S. Thalhammer, A. Brachmann & G. Heubl 2006. Comparative analysis of a translocated copy of the trnK intron in carnivorous family Nepenthaceae. Molecular Phylogenetics and Evolution 39(2): 478–490. 
 Mey, F.S. 2014. A short visit to Papua, video by Alastair Robinson and Davide Baj. Strange Fruits: A Garden's Chronicle, February 25, 2014.
  Oikawa, T. 1992. Nepenthes maxima Reinw.. In: . [The Grief Vanishing.] Parco Co., Japan. p. 62.
 Porter, J.N. 1940. Note on the germination of Nepenthes seed sown on agar. Botanical Museum Leaflets Harvard University 8(3): 65–68.
 Renner, T. & C.D. Specht 2011. A sticky situation: assessing adaptations for plant carnivory in the Caryophyllales by means of stochastic character mapping. International Journal of Plant Sciences 172(7): 889–901. 
 Renner, T. & C.D. Specht 2012. Molecular and functional evolution of class I chitinases for plant carnivory in the Caryophyllales. Molecular Biology and Evolution 29(10): 2971–2985. 
 Rischer, R., M. Wenzel, J. Schlauer, G. Bringmann & L.A. Assi 1998.  In: J. Schlauer & B. Meyers-Rice (eds.) Proceedings: Second Conference of the International Carnivorous Plant Society. International Carnivorous Plant Society, Fullerton. pp. 6–7.
 Shin, K.-S., S. Lee & B.J. Cha 2007. Suppression of phytopathogenic fungi by hexane extract of Nepenthes ventricosa x maxima leaf. Fitoterapia 78(7–8): 585–586. 
 Slack, A. 1979. Nepenthes maxima. In: Carnivorous Plants. Ebury Press, London. p. 86.
 Thorogood, C. 2010. The Malaysian Nepenthes: Evolutionary and Taxonomic Perspectives. Nova Science Publishers, New York.
 Toma, I., C. Toma & I. Stănescu 2002.  Revue Roumaine de Biologie, Série de Biologie Végétale 47(1–2): 3–7.

External links

 Nepenthes maxima from Celebes go international

Carnivorous plants of Asia
maxima
Flora of New Guinea
Flora of Sulawesi
Flora of the Maluku Islands
Plants described in 1824
Least concern plants